Swindon Viewpoint was a local community cable TV channel based in, and serving Swindon. It has been through several incarnations, including its early experimental phase, its main phase in the 1970s and 1980s, its 1990s phase where it operated under the title Swindon's Local Channel, and its current online phase.

History
Swindon Viewpoint began broadcasting on 11 September 1973 as an experiment in community cable television, or public-access television. It was initially by Richard Dunn, who later went on to become head of Thames Television. The experiment started with EMI finance on the Radio Rentals cable radio and television relay network. Local people could train in television programme making by using television production equipment. Many of its programmes were 'one-off' documentaries that interested the volunteers involved or programmes of more general public interest. The studios were in the basement of Radio Rentals' premises in Swindon's Victoria Road.

The experimental phase ended in 1976 when EMI decided to pull out of funding the service, although it was considered popular and appeared to be flourishing. The main reason seems to have been that the government would not allow advertising or sponsorship. After much local protest, Swindon Viewpoint was sold to the public of Swindon for £1 and an elected board of directors set up to oversee it. Viewpoint thus became the first television service that was publicly owned and managed. Programming continued for the rest of the decade with a staff of around six to train the public to make programmes, and was funded by a mix of sponsorship and a Ladbrokes operated lottery scheme, a forerunner of the National Lottery. Viewpoint's central programming strand was a magazine-based programme called Seen in Swindon.

When the lottery scheme ended in 1980, funding dried up and Viewpoint went into partnership with Media Arts, the public media centre in Swindon, placing its TV production equipment there, though this partnership recognised and maintained the independence of Viewpoint. With no staff the operation was now entirely volunteer based, but nevertheless operated through the 1980s. Its main programme strand was called Access Swindon. In the early 1990s Media Arts was restructured by the council and funding for Viewpoint was withdrawn. With no access to production resources the board of directors resolved to suspend programming operations but maintain its structure and registration as a company, pending a more favourable climate. Broadcasting stopped temporarily at the end of April 1980 but continued intermittently with programmes made by volunteers over the next decade.

The station now operates as an online community TV station at its website where has a selection from its archive of programmes, as well as current material, available for online streaming.

Legacy

The station has been seen as unique in a number of ways; it was Britain's first and longest running public-access television service, and was also notable for being owned by the public in its early years.

References

Further reading

External links 
Swindon Viewpoint

Community television channels in the United Kingdom
Mass media in Wiltshire
Television channels and stations established in 1973
1973 establishments in England
Defunct television channels in the United Kingdom
Television channels and stations disestablished in 1980
1980 disestablishments in England